George Larry Conley (born January 22, 1944) is an American retired professional basketball player.

A 6'3" guard, Conley played college basketball at the University of Kentucky under coach Adolph Rupp. During the 1965–66 season, Conley was a starter on a Kentucky team that also featured Tommy Kron and future Basketball Hall-of-Famers Pat Riley and Louie Dampier. The Wildcats lost the championship game of that season's NCAA tournament 72–65 to Texas Western. This game was the center of the 2006 film Glory Road.

Conley played in the first Kentucky Colonels game of the American Basketball Association before committing to the army.  He played 18 minutes and scored two points in his only game. He currently broadcasts college basketball for Fox Sports, after previously performing the same role for ESPN, NBC, CBS, ABC, and Raycom Sports.

Personal life
Conley was born to George and Wanda Conley. His father was a Southeastern Conference basketball official for almost three decades.

References

External links
Basketball-reference.com stats

1944 births
Living people
American men's basketball players
Basketball players from Kentucky
College basketball announcers in the United States
Kentucky Colonels players
Kentucky Wildcats men's basketball players
Parade High School All-Americans (boys' basketball)
Paul G. Blazer High School alumni
Shooting guards
Sportspeople from Ashland, Kentucky